Konstantin P. Bryliakov (born 1 June 1977) is a Russian chemist and author of monographs and over 170 research papers, textbooks, and patents. He is a professor at Russian Academy of Sciences and Novosibirsk State University.

Biography 
Bryliakov was born in Yoshkar-Ola, USSR. He studied chemistry at Novosibirsk State University from 1994 to 1999, after which he joined the Boreskov Institute of Catalysis as a PhD student and Novosibirsk State University as a teaching assistant.

Academic career 
Bryliakov received a Cand. Chem. Sci. (PhD) degree in chemical physics from the Voevodsky Institute of Chemical Kinetics and Combustion, Novosibirsk, in 2001, and a Doctor of Chemical Sciences degree (Habilitation) in catalysis from the Boreskov Institute of Catalysis, Novosibirsk, in 2008. He is currently a head of Department of Mechanisms of Catslytic Reactions at the Boreskov Institute of Catalysis (since 2021) and a full professor at Novosibirsk State University (since 2018). In 2016, Konstantin Bryliakov was elected professor of the Russian Academy of Sciences.

Bryliakov served as an invited editor of catalysis journals Topics in Catalysis and Catalysis Today. He was also a member of scientific committees of international catalysis conferences. He has been member of the Advisory Board of Referees of ARKIVOC since 2004 and International Advisory Board member of ChemCatChem.

Research 
Bryliakov's research interests include green enantioselective (stereoselective) synthesis (mainly oxidation), biomimetic chemistry, coordination polymerization of olefins, including mechanisms of these reactions. Konstantin Bryliakov pioneered the use of homochiral metal-organic frameworks as chiral stationary phases for chromatographic separation of enantiomers. He discovered a new dynamic non-linear effect in asymmetric catalysis, named asymmetric autoamplification.

International activities 
Bryliakov has worked at the University of Konstanz, University of East Anglia, Reims University, University of Castilla-La Mancha, Institute of Chemistry of the Chinese Academy of Sciences, and managed several international research projects supported by RFBR.

Publications

References

External links 

 Konstantin Bryliakov at Google Scholar
 Konstantin Bryliakov at Researchgate.net

1977 births
Living people
Russian chemists
Scientists from Novosibirsk
Novosibirsk State University alumni